William A. "Lefty" James (July 1, 1889 – May 3, 1933) was a left handed Major League Baseball (MLB) pitcher who played for the Cleveland Naps from 1912 to 1914.  He also played 12 seasons in the minor leagues, playing for the Toledo Mud Hens, Cleveland Bearcats, Cleveland Spiders, Louisville Colonels, San Antonio Broncos, Portland Beavers, Beaumont Exporters, New Orleans Pelicans, Atlanta Crackers, Chattanooga Lookouts, and Mobile Bears.

James was born, and died, in Glen Roy, Ohio, and is buried at Ridgewood Cemetery in nearby Wellston.

References

External links

1889 births
1933 deaths
Cleveland Naps players
Major League Baseball pitchers
Baseball players from Ohio
Toledo Mud Hens players
Cleveland Bearcats players
Cleveland Spiders (minor league) players
Louisville Colonels (minor league) players
San Antonio Bronchos players
Portland Beavers players
Beaumont Exporters players
New Orleans Pelicans (baseball) players
Atlanta Crackers players
Mobile Bears players
Chattanooga Lookouts players